Kehancha is a town in Kenya's Migori County. It has a total population of 256,086 people.

References 

Migori County
Populated places in Kenya